Trafalgar Road Ground is a cricket ground in Southport, Merseyside.  The first recorded match on the ground was in 1956, when the Lancashire Second XI played Cheshire in the Minor Counties Championship.

In 1959, the ground held its first first-class match when Lancashire played Worcestershire in the County Championship.  From 1959 to 2017, the ground played host to 44 first-class matches, the last of which came in the 2017 County Championship between Lancashire and Middlesex.

The ground has also held List-A matches, the first of which saw Lancashire play Glamorgan in the 1969 Player's County League.  From 1969 to 1987, the ground held 4 List-A matches, the last of which saw Lancashire play Scotland in the 1987 Benson and Hedges Cup.

With the first recorded match on the ground in 1956 involving the Lancashire Second XI, the ground has since held a combined total of 25 Second XI fixtures for the Lancashire Second XI in the Minor Counties Championship, Second XI Championship and Second XI Trophy.

In local domestic cricket, the ground is the home venue of Southport & Birkdale Cricket Club. who play in the Liverpool & District Cricket Competition. In February 2016, the Club signed a three year staging agreement with Lancashire to host county cricket, which is believed to be the first of its kind in England and Wales.

References

External links
Trafalgar Road Ground on CricketArchive
Trafalgar Road Ground on Cricinfo

Cricket grounds in Merseyside
Southport
Sports venues completed in 1956